Chantal Léger (born 6 June 1978) is a Canadian sailor. She competed in the Yngling event at the 2004 Summer Olympics. Other events she competed in include the 2011 and the 2015 Pan American Games.

References

External links
 

1978 births
Living people
Canadian female sailors (sport)
Olympic sailors of Canada
Sailors at the 2004 Summer Olympics – Yngling
People from Senneville, Quebec
Sportspeople from Quebec